Chiang Kui is a crater on Mercury. It has a diameter of 41 kilometers. Its name was adopted by the International Astronomical Union (IAU) in 1976. Chiang Kui is named for the Chinese composer Jiang Kui, who lived in the 12th century.

References

Impact craters on Mercury